Stadion Oláh Gábor Út is a multi-use stadium in Debrecen, Hungary.  It is currently used mostly for football matches and was the home stadium of Debreceni VSC.  The stadium is able to hold 10,200 people.  It was replaced by Nagyerdei Stadion in 2014.

Gallery

Attendances
As of 24 May 2016.

External links
Stadion Oláh Gábor út at magyarfutball.hu
Stadion Oláh Gábor Út at allstadiums.ru

References

Debreceni VSC
Olah Gabor Ut
Olah Gabor Ut